Tantrum is a steel roller coaster at Six Flags Darien Lake in Darien, New York, United States. It is a Euro-Fighter roller coaster manufactured by German manufacturer Gerstlauer and opened on May 25, 2018. It was the first roller coaster in the state of New York to feature a beyond-vertical drop and the park's first new roller coaster since 2008.

Ride experience
Immediately upon leaving the station, the car turns slightly to the left and then begins to ascend the  lift hill. The car then enters an Immelmann loop before traveling through a curved drop to the right. The car then enters a cutback, followed by an inclined loop. The train then enters the brake run before turning left into the station. A ride on Tantrum lasts approximately one minute.

References

Roller coasters in New York (state)
Six Flags Darien Lake